The Regent Apartments, located in northwest Portland, Oregon, are listed on the National Register of Historic Places.

See also
 National Register of Historic Places listings in Northwest Portland, Oregon

References

1937 establishments in Oregon
Art Deco architecture in Oregon
Individually listed contributing properties to historic districts on the National Register in Oregon
Moderne architecture in Oregon
Northwest Portland, Oregon
Portland Historic Landmarks
Residential buildings completed in 1937
Apartment buildings on the National Register of Historic Places in Portland, Oregon